Roscommon is a town in Ireland.

Roscommon may also refer to:

Other places
County Roscommon, in Ireland
Roscommon, Michigan, village in the United States
Roscommon County, Michigan, county in the United States
Roscommon Township, Michigan, township in the United States

Constituencies
Roscommon Borough (Parliament of Ireland constituency) before 1801
County Roscommon (Parliament of Ireland constituency) before 1801
Roscommon (UK Parliament constituency)
North Roscommon (UK Parliament constituency)
South Roscommon (UK Parliament constituency)
Leitrim–Roscommon North (Dáil constituency)
Mayo South–Roscommon South (Dáil constituency)
Roscommon (Dáil constituency)
Roscommon–Leitrim (Dáil constituency)
Roscommon (Dáil constituency)
Longford–Roscommon (Dáil constituency)
Roscommon–South Leitrim (Dáil constituency)

Institutions
Roscommon railway station, Ireland
Roscommon County - Blodgett Memorial Airport, Michigan, United States
Roscommon High School, in Roscommon, Michigan
Roscommon School, Primary School in Manurewa, a suburb of Manukau City, Auckland Region, New Zealand
Roscommon Zoo, Michigan

Other
Roscommon GAA, the Gaelic Athletic Association board for County Roscommon, Ireland
Earl of Roscommon, title in the Peerage of Ireland 1622–1850